Macchial Lake or Machyal Lake is a low altitude lake which is situated in Mandi district in the state of Himachal Pradesh, India. The lake is considered sacred and is named after Machinder Nath or Matasya Avtar of Lord Vishnu literally 'The Fish God'. One of the famous disciple of Yogi Machinder Nath was Guru Gorakhnath. Yogi Machinder Nath learnt the Science of Shabar Mantra from The Sun, and teaches the same to his disciple Guru Gorakhnath. He is also seen as the founder of the Natha Sampradaya, having received the teachings  from Lord Shiva.

Getting there
The lake is located 8 km southwards from Jogindernagar at Joginder Nagar-Sarkaghat state highway. Further, 2 km southwards is the first Mahseer farm of India at the village of Bhararu. A comparatively larger and wider stream is one kilometre eastwards of the lake near Uhl stage 3 project site that remains crowded with Himalayan Golden Mahseer.

Religious Significance
Machhiyal is sacred to local natives and surrounding villages. In earlier days, people made their wishes to Machinder Nath and on fulfilment of their wishes, they would offer the promised gift to the God. One of such offerings was to ornament the sacred Himalayan Golden Mahseer fish with gold nasal rings and in earlier days such sacred Golden Mahseer fish wearing golden rings could be noticed easily in the Lake. This tradition has almost disappeared nowadays. However, it is still common to feed fish to pay obeisance or as a wish for good luck and to avoid bad luck. People take holy baths in the stream on particular days of Hindu calendar. Fishing is prohibited in the stream following religious significance.

A fair marking the commencement of the Indian traditional month Vaishakh is held here every year. It is held during three days in which people from surrounding villages gather and observe the fair with great pomp and show. Along with a number of other sports activities including wrestling or kusti is centre of interest which is held on the final day. Wrestlers from distant cities and districts come to show their talent and to win a handsome prize money.

History
Around 2000's, due to presence of some poisonous substances discharged into the river Ranna Khadd, hundreds of fish died in and around the Machhial Lake. Showing divine respect toward the god, devotees buried all the dead fish in nearby land and criticized the incident with anger and resentment.

External links
Machhiyal lake
himachaltourism.gov.in

Lakes of Himachal Pradesh
Geography of Mandi district
Jogindernagar